Miss Venezuela 1982 was the 29th Miss Venezuela pageant, was held in Caraballeda, Vargas state, Venezuela, on May 6, 1982, after weeks of events.  The winner of the pageant was Ana Teresa Oropeza, Miss Guárico.

The pageant was broadcast live on Venevision from the Macuto Sheraton Hotel in Caraballeda, Vargas state. At the conclusion of the final night of competition, outgoing titleholder Irene Sáez, Miss Venezuela 1981 and Miss Universe 1981, crowned Ana Teresa Oropeza of Guárico as the new Miss Venezuela. Veteran Mexican presenter Raúl Velasco joined the hosting team for the first time during that year's pageant, the first time it would be aired via satellite to the United States and all over Spanish-speaking areas of Latin America.

Results
Miss Venezuela 1982 - Ana Teresa Oropeza (Miss Guárico)

The runners-up were:
1st runner-up - Michelle Shoda (Miss Falcón)
2nd runner-up - Amaury Martínez (Miss Amazonas)
3rd runner-up - Conchy Grande (Miss Aragua)
4th runner-up - Lily Protovin (Miss Miranda) (disqualified)
5th runner-up - Sondra Carpio (Miss Lara)
6th runner-up - Diana Judas (Miss Sucre)
7th runner-up - Sandra Martínez (Miss Trujillo) (entered runners-up after disqualification of Miss Miranda)

Special awards
 Miss Congeniality - Maria Guadalupe Pérez (Miss Departamento Vargas)
 Miss Elegance - Michelle Shoda (Miss Falcón)
 Miss Amity - Thamara Angola (Miss Nueva Esparta)

Delegates
The Miss Venezuela 1982 delegates are:

 Miss Amazonas - Amaury Martínez Macero
 Miss Anzoátegui - Yajaira Pérez Higuera
 Miss Aragua - Conchy Grande Casas
 Miss Barinas - Maria Gracia Vásquez
 Miss Bolívar - Maria Teresa Viera Rodríguez
 Miss Carabobo - Maria Elena Fuentes
 Miss Departamento Vargas - Maria Guadalupe Pérez Domiz
 Miss Distrito Federal - Lethzaida Vargas
  Miss Falcón - Michelle Shoda Belloso
 Miss Guárico - Ana Teresa Oropeza Villavicencio
 Miss Lara - Sondra Carpio Useche
 Miss Mérida - Verónica Pérez Rodríguez
 Miss Miranda  - Lily Protovin Müller
 Miss Monagas - Maria del Rosario Semidey
 Miss Nueva Esparta - Thamara Angola
 Miss Portuguesa - Vicky Hatziyannis Paván
 Miss Sucre - Diana Judas Perdomo†
 Miss Trujillo - Sandra Martínez Sarcos
 Miss Zulia - Gisela Rojas

External links
Miss Venezuela official website

1982 beauty pageants
1982 in Venezuela